KEGT may refer to:

 Wellington Municipal Airport (ICAO code KEGT)
 KEGT (FM), a low-power radio station (106.5 FM) licensed to serve San Miguel, California, United States